Ferdinand Boogaerts (25 February 1921 – 30 June 2006) was a Belgian footballer. He played in six matches for the Belgium national football team from 1951 to 1952.

References

External links
 

1921 births
2006 deaths
Belgian footballers
Belgium international footballers
People from Zaventem
Association football goalkeepers
Standard Liège players